The Nunatta Sunakkutaangit Museum is a museum of Nunavut history and Inuit culture, located in Iqaluit, Nunavut. The museum was founded in 1969 by two employees of Canada's Department of Indian Affairs. The museum is housed in a former Hudson's Bay Company building. The building was moved on tracks from Apex, Nunavut to Iqaluit before being renovated.

References

External links
Official site

Nunavut society
Museums in Nunavut
Inuit culture